Streptomyces daqingensis is a bacterium species from the genus of Streptomyces which has been isolated from saline-alkaline soil in Heilongjiang in China.

See also 
 List of Streptomyces species

References

External links
Type strain of Streptomyces daqingensis at BacDive -  the Bacterial Diversity Metadatabase

daqingensis
Bacteria described in 2016